Feelplus Inc. (株式会社フィールプラス Kabushiki gaisha Fiirupurasu) was a Japanese video game developer and a subsidiary of AQ Interactive. The studio was conceived by Microsoft Game Studios specifically to aid Mistwalker in video game development. Former employees of Nautilus and Square Enix later joined in. By September 2002, Cavia (later to become AQ Interactive) bought the company. In May 2005, it became a fully owned subsidiary and Scarab changed its name to Feelplus Inc.

On August 2010, Feelplus Inc., Artoon and Cavia were absorbed into AQ Interactive.

Games
As Scarab
Survival Arts (1993)
Dyna Gear (1994)
Battle Monsters (1995)
Killing Zone (1996)
Zen-Nihon Pro Wrestling Featuring Virtua (1997)
Macross: Do You Remember Love? (1997)
Fighting Vipers 2 (2001, Dreamcast port)

As Feelplus
Lost Odyssey (2007) co-developed with Mistwalker
Infinite Undiscovery (2008) Visual production
Star Ocean: The Last Hope (2009) Visual production
Ju-On: The Grudge (2009)
No More Heroes: Heroes' Paradise (2010)
Ninety-Nine Nights II (2010) co-developed with Q Entertainment
MindJack (2011)
Moon Diver (2011)

See also
AQ Interactive
Mistwalker
Nautilus

References

External links
Official Scarab website via Internet Archive
Official Feelplus website via Internet Archive
Scarab at MobyGames
Feelplus at MobyGames

AQ Interactive
Defunct video game companies of Japan
Video game companies established in 1992
Video game companies disestablished in 2010
Video game development companies
Japanese companies established in 1992
Japanese companies disestablished in 2010